The Bartonville Agreement came from a meeting held in May 1999 by bishops representing both the Anglican Communion's American province (The Episcopal Church) and a number of Continuing Anglican jurisdictions in North America. As such, it was an early effort made by conservative Episcopal bishops and Continuing Anglican bishops to voice a common set of principles which might become the basis of future cooperation between their churches or dioceses. The schism that had divided these church bodies had occurred in 1977 at the Congress of St. Louis when "Continuers" met and formed a new Anglican church in reaction to changes in doctrine and practice that had been approved by The Episcopal Church and the Anglican Church of Canada.

These bishops assembled in Bartonville, Illinois at St. Benedict's Abbey. In his opening comments the host, Abbot Alberto Morales, encouraged those present "to let the Holy Spirit guide us and show us the way that we should go...that as we face the new millennium we may present to the world a portion of the Anglican Communion reconciled and united, which in turn, may be an example to imitate for all good and faithful Anglicans and for the Church in general."  The result of the meeting was the signing of a "Call to prayer" for unity and a determination to meet again.

A second convocation of bishops took place in Bartonville on October 29 of the same year.  The result of this meeting was the signing of the Articles of Ecclesiastical Fellowship.

The signatories of the original compact were the following:
 Keith Ackerman, Episcopal Diocese of Quincy
 Robert Crawley, Anglican Catholic Church of Canada
 A. Donald Davies, Episcopal Missionary Church Primate *
 Louis Falk, Anglican Church in America Primate
 Herbert Groce, Anglican Rite Synod in America
 Walter Grundorf, Anglican Province of America Primate
 John Hepworth, Anglican Catholic Church in Australia
 Jack Leo Iker, Episcopal Diocese of Fort Worth
 Joel Johnson, Anglican Rite Synod in the Americas
 Edward MacBurney, retired Episcopal bishop of Quincy
 Scott Earle McLaughlin, Orthodox Anglican Church
 Robert Mercer, Anglican Catholic Church of Canada Primate
 Donald Parsons, retired Episcopal bishop of Quincy
 Donald Perschall, American Anglican Church/Anglican Synod Primate
 Larry Shaver, Diocese of St. Augustine, Anglican Rite Synod in America
* It is reported that Davies was present but did not sign the document.

Present but not empowered to sign was:
 Joseph Deyman, Diocese of the Midwest, Anglican Catholic Church
 Royal U. Grote, Jr. Diocese of Mid-America, Presiding Bishop of the Reformed Episcopal Church

The following were signatories of the Articles of Ecclesiastical Fellowship:

 Louis Falk, ACA Primate
 Herbert Groce, ARSA Primate
 Walter Grundorf, APA Primate
 Scott Earle McLaughlin, OAC
 Donald Perschall, AAC & AS Primate
 Larry Shaver ARSA
 Richard Boyce, Diocese of the West, Anglican Province of America
 Ronald Johnson, Philippine Independent Catholic Church
 Robert J. Godfrey, Orthodox Anglican Church

See also
 Congress of St. Louis

References

External links
Webpage of St. Benedict's Abbey

Continuing Anglican movement
Anglican ecumenism
Peoria County, Illinois
1999 in Christianity